Situ is a Rgyalrong language spoken in Sichuan, China. The name "Situ", literally "four Tusi", comes from a historical name of the Ma'erkang region.

Distribution
Gates (2012: 102-103) lists the following locations where Zbu is spoken. It is spoken by over 35,000-40,000 people in 57 villages.
southern half of Ma’ěrkāng/'Bar-kams County (53 villages)
Zhuókèjī, Mǎ’ěrkāng/'Bar-kams, and Sōnggǎng/rDzong-'gag Towns, including surrounding villages
Sūomò/Somang and Báiwān/Brag-bar Townships
Báiwān/Brag-bar and Dǎngbà/Dam-pa Townships
Jīnchuān/Chu-chen County (4 villages)
Jímù/Kye-mo Township (although Nilong Village primarily has Lavrung speakers)
possibly also Kǎlājiǎo and Sāwǎjiǎo Townships
northwestern Li County, Sichuan
southernmost Hóngyuán County (recent migrants)

Dialects
Gates (2012: 103) lists 7 dialects of Situ.
Jiaomuzu Township 脚木足乡, western Barkam County
Jimu Township 集木乡, Jinchuan County
Dangba Township 党坝乡, southwestern Barkam County
Bawang-Songgang Townships 巴旺乡-松岗镇, west-central Barkam County
Ben Town 本镇, central Barkam County
Zhuokeji Town 卓克基镇, central Barkam County
Suomo Township 梭磨乡, eastern Barkam County

Phonology 

  can appear in Chinese loans, and can also be heard as a voiceless bilabial fricative .

 The diphthong  can be heard as more open-front , after being followed by a velar consonant.
  can be heard as a front-mid , when between a front and central vowel, or between a back and central vowel.
 The distinction between the central grade (front and back vowels) and the non-central grade is fundamental in the vowel system of the brag-bar.

Grammar

Verbal agreement
Data adapted from Lin (1993). Columns indicate the patient, and rows the agent. For example, the item tə-no-n in row "2sg" and column "3" means "you(singular) drive him/her/it/them.two/them".

Stem alternation
Some Situ dialects have rich stem changes. For example, stem alternations is quasi-ubiquitous in Brag-bar, observed in both inflectional and derivational morphology.

Inflectional stem changes

Inflectional stem alternations in Brag-bar occur in different TAME and argument indexation categories. Generally speaking, stem I is used in most non-past categories as well as inferential past, and stem II in non-inferential past and egophoric present contexts. In most cases, stem II is derived from stem I by tonal inversion between a high and falling tones, sometimes with vowel alternations between the central grade (ə, ɐ, a) and non-central grade (i/u, e/o, iɛ). 

Verbs with particular syllable structures distinguish stem I’ or stem II’, sensitive to phonological environment. Verbs with an open syllable and a high tone, as well as those with a closed syllable ending in a stop, distinguish stem I’ from stem I, occurring in non-suffixing non-past and inferential forms; verbs with an open syllable and a falling tone may distinguish stem II’ from stem II in non-suffixing non-inferential past and egophoric present forms. Stem I’ and stem II’ are formed by a unidirectional vowel shift to the non-central grade.

Derivational stem changes

Stem changes are also observed in Brag-bar derivational morphology, governed by a unidirectional tonal alternation rule, either to a high or to falling tone. Tonal alternations are often accompanied with vowel changes, of which the direction is likely to be correlated with the verb stem’s syllable structure. For open syllable verb stems, alternations to high tone happens with vowel shift to the non-central grade, whereas that to falling tone co-exists with vowel shift to the central grade.

 ka-viɛ̂ 'to do' → oblique participle sa-vâ 
 ka-viɛ̂ 'to do' → autobenefactive verb ka-nə-viɛ́ 'to do (for oneself)'

 ka-thɐ̂ 'to go upward' → applicative verb ka-thót 'to take upward'
 ka-ɟə̂ 'to go downward' → applicative verb ka-ɟút 'to take downward'

Kinship terminology 

Zhang and Fan (2020) show that the Brag-bar terminology preserves indirect traces of the Omaha kinship terminology, characterized by a cross-parallel distinction and skewing rules. Omaha skewing is directly observed in the Japhug terminology and might once have existed in Tangut.

References 

 
 
 
 

Qiangic languages
Languages of China